is the eighth studio album by the Japanese girl band Princess Princess, released on December 22, 1993, by Sony Records. It includes the single "Futari ga Owaru Toki". The album's songs are themed around breakups.

The album peaked at No. 2 on Oricon's albums chart. It was also certified Gold by the RIAJ.

Track listing 
All music is composed by Kaori Okui, except where indicated; all music is arranged by Princess Princess.

Charts

Certification

References

External links
 
 
 

Princess Princess (band) albums
1993 albums
Sony Music Entertainment Japan albums
Japanese-language albums